A sabaton or solleret is part of a knight's body armor that covers the foot.

History
Fourteenth and fifteenth century sabatons typically end in a tapered point well past the actual toes of the wearer's foot, following fashionable shoe shapes of the fourteenth century. Sabatons of the first half of sixteenth century end at the tip of the toe and may be wider than the actual foot. They were the first piece of armour to be put on, and were made of riveted iron plates called lames. These  plates generally covered only the top of the foot. Some sources maintain that the broad-toed variant is the true sabaton, whereas the earlier versions should be referred to as a solleret.

The sabaton was not commonly used by knights or men at arms fighting on foot. Instead, many would simply wear leather shoes or boots. Heavy or pointy metal footwear would severely hinder movement and mobility on the ground, particularly under wet or muddy conditions. Attacks against the feet are not common in dismounted combat, as a strike to an enemy's foot would typically put the attacker in a very awkward and vulnerable position. Conversely, a mounted knight's feet would be at perfect height for strikes from dismounted soldiers, and so sabatons or other foot armour would be vital when riding into battle. An earlier solution was for the mail of the chausses to completely cover the foot, but later the mail terminated at the ankle, either overlapping the outside of the sabaton or extending beneath it.

The effigy of Richard Beauchamp, 13th Earl of Warwick in the Collegiate Church of St Mary, Warwick, shows how 15th century Italian-style sabatons would have been worn. These consist of a toe cap, four articulated lames, a foot plate and ankle plate, and a hinged heel cap, joined with buckled straps. Although the spurs are missing from the effigy, remains of rivet holes and staples may represent the way that the spurs would have been directly attached to the heel cap of the sabaton, rather than being strapped on afterwards.

Other uses
"Sabaton" is also the name of a type of broad-toed Flemish shoe, popular in the Late Middle Ages.

Sabaton is the name of a Swedish heavy metal band who write songs based on military history.

References

Historical footwear
Medieval armour
Western plate armour